Suling Wang is an internationally recognized painter and contemporary artist, known predominantly for her large scale abstract works. She currently lives and works in London, UK and Taichung, Taiwan.

Wang's art is inspired by Taiwanese oral tradition from her childhood and her exploration of identity within Eastern and Western cultures. Her work is composed of meticulously created layers of painted calligraphy and cartoon-like forms overlaid atop other shapes that suggest trees, stems, and mountains.

Early life 
Wang grew up in rural Taiwan and in 1993 moved to London to study fine art at Central St. Martins College of Art and Design.  She completed her master's degree in painting from the Royal College of Art in 1999. In 1995 she received the Swiss National Tourism/Tate Gallery Travel Award. In 1998, she was the recipient of the Studio Award from the Cité internationale des arts in Paris and the John Crane Travel Award.

Exhibitions 
Wang's work has been exhibited internationally in solo and group exhibitions. She held solo exhibitions at Eslite Gallery, Taipei(2011); Pékin Fine Arts, Beijing (2007); Soledad Lorenzo, Madrid (2006); Lehmann Maupin, New York (2005); and Victoria Miro Gallery, London (2005). She was included in group exhibitions such as Red Hot: Asian Art Today from the Chaney Collection at the Museum of Fine Arts Houston; Passion for Paint at The National Gallery in London, 2006 and The Guggenheim Collection: 1940s to Now at the National Gallery of Victoria, Melbourne, Australia, 2007.

Museum collections 

Her work is represented in the permanent collections of important museums, particularly in USA, where her paintings are exhibited at The Solomon R. Guggenheim Museum, New York; the Museum of Contemporary Art, Los Angeles; the Cincinnati Art Museum; The Utah Museum of Fine Arts; and the Rubell Museum, Miami.; White Rabbit Gallery, Australia and the Pizzuti Collection, Ohio.

See also
Taiwanese art

References

External links 
Official Website of the Artist Suling Wang
Guggenheim Museum

Taiwanese painters
Taiwanese contemporary artists
Living people
Alumni of Central Saint Martins
1968 births
Taiwanese women painters